Neo-Advaita, also called the Satsang-movement and Nondualism, is a New Religious Movement, emphasizing the direct recognition of the non-existence of the "I" or "ego," without the need of preparatory practice. Its teachings are derived from, but not authorised by, the teachings of the 20th century sage Ramana Maharshi, as interpreted and popularized by H. W. L. Poonja and several of his western students.

It is part of a larger religious current called immediatism by Arthur Versluis, which has its roots in both western and eastern spirituality. Western influences are western esoteric traditions like Transcendentalism, and "New Age millennialism, self-empowerment and self-therapy".

Neo-Advaita makes little use of the "traditional language or cultural frames of Advaita Vedanta", and some have criticised it for its lack of preparatory training, and regard enlightenment-experiences induced by Neo-Advaita as superficial.

Teachings
The basic practice of neo-Advaita is self-inquiry, via the question "Who am I?", or simply the direct recognition of the non-existence of the "I" or "ego." This recognition is taken to be equal to the Advaita Vedanta recognition of the identity of Atman and Brahman, or the recognition of the "Formless Self." According to neo-Advaitins, no preparatory practice is necessary, nor prolonged study of religious scriptures or tradition: insight alone suffices.

Poonja, who is credited as one of the main instigators of the neo-Advaita movement, saw this realization as in itself liberating from karmic consequences and further rebirth. According to Poonja "karmic tendencies remained after enlightenment, [but] the enlightened person was no longer identified with them and, therefore, did not accrue further karmic consequences." According to Cohen, Poonja "insisted that the realization of the Self had nothing to do with worldly behavior, and he did not believe fully transcending the ego was possible." For Poonja, ethical standards were based on a dualistic understanding of duality and the notion of an individual agent, and therefore were not indicative of "non-dual enlightenment: "For Poonja, the goal was the realization of the self; the illusory realm of relative reality was ultimately irrelevant."

History

According to Lucas and Frawley, the spiritual root of neo-Advaita is Ramana Maharshi, whose teachings, and method of self-inquiry could easily be transposed to North America’s liberal spiritual subculture. Popular interest in Indian religions goes as far back as the early 19th century, and was stimulated by the American Transcendentalists and the Theosophical Society. In the 1930s Ramana Maharshi's teachings were brought to the west by Paul Brunton, a Theosophist, in his A Search in Secret India. Stimulated by Arthur Osborne, in the 1960s Bhagawat Singh actively started to spread Ramana Maharshi's teachings in the USA.

Since the 1970s western interest in Asian religions has seen a rapid growth. Ramana Maharshi's teachings have been further popularized in the west via H. W. L. Poonja and his students. Poonja, better known as Papaji, "told, inferred, or allowed hundreds of individuals to believe they were fully enlightened simply because they'd had one, or many, powerful experiences of awakening." It was those students who initiated the "neo-Advaita", or "satsang" movement, which has become an important constituent of popular western spirituality. It is being spread by websites and publishing enterprises, which give an easy access to its teachings.

The "Ramana effect"

Lucas has called the popularisation of Ramana Maharshi's teachings in the west "the Ramana effect". According to Lucas, Ramana Maharshi was the greatest modern proponent of Advaita Vedanta, well known for emphasizing the enquiry of the question "Who am I?" as a means to attain awakening. According to Lucas, following Thomas Csordas, the success of this movement is due to a "portable practice" and a "transposable message". Ramana Maharshi's main practice, self-inquiry via the question "Who am I?", is easily practiceable in a non-institutionalized context. His visitors and devotees did not have to adopt the Vedantic culture, nor to commit themselves to an institution or ideology, to be able to practice self-inquiry. Ramana's teachings are transposable into a western context. Ramana Maharshi himself did not demand a shift in religious affiliation, and was himself acquainted with western religions, using quotes from the Bible. Neo-Advaita teachers have further deemphasized the traditional language and worldframe of Advaita, using a modern, psychologized worldframe to present their teachings as a form of self-help, which is easily accessible to a larger audience.

Western discourses

The western approach to "Asian enlightenment traditions" is highly eclectic, drawing on various Asian traditions, as well as "numerous Western discourses such as psychology, science, and politics." Neo-Advaita uses western discourses, such as "New Age millennialism, Zen, self-empowerment and self-therapy" to transmit its teachings. It makes little use of the "traditional language or cultural frames of Advaita Vedanta," and is framed in a western construction of experiential and perennial mysticism, "to the disregard of its social, ethical and political aspects." This "modern experiential and perennialist mystical framework" emphasizes  Perennialism, the idea that there is a common, mystical core to all religions, which can be empirically validated by personal experience. It has pervaded the western understanding of Asian religions, and can be found in Swami Vivekananda and Sarvepalli Radhakrishnan's Neo-Vedanta, but also in the works of D.T. Suzuki and his "decontextualized and experiential account" of Zen Buddhism. It can also be found in the Theosophical Society, and the contemporary New Age culture, with influences like Aldous Huxley's The Perennial Philosophy and The Doors of Perception, and writers like Ken Wilber.

Gregg Lahood also mentions Neo-Advaita as an ingredient of "cosmological hybridization, a process in which spiritual paradises are bound together", as exemplified in American Transcendentalism, New Age, transpersonal psychology and the works of Ken Wilber are examples: Brown and Leledaki place this "hybridization" in a "structurationist" approach, pointing out that this is an "invented tradition", which is a response to a novel situation, although it claims a continuity with a "historic past", which is "largely facticious." Brown and Leledaki see these newly emerging traditions as part of western Orientalism, the fascination of western cultures with eastern cultures, but also the reduction of "Asian societies, its people, practices and cultures to essentialist images of the 'other'". Brown and Leledaki also note that this Orientalism is not a one-way affair, but that "there has been a dynamic interaction between Asian and Western representatives of various religious traditions over the last 150 years," and that this "blending of thought and practice" is a co-creation from modernist religious movements in both East and West.

According to Arthur Versluis, neo-Advaita is part of a larger religious current which he calls immediatism, "the assertion of immediate spiritual illumination without much if any preparatory practice within a particular religious tradition." Its origins predate American Transcendentalism. In American Gurus: From Transcendentalism to New Age Religion, Versluis describes the emergence of immediatist gurus: gurus who are not connected to any of the traditional religions, and promise instant enlightenment and liberation. These include Eckhart Tolle, and Andrew Cohen. "Immediatism" refers to "a religious assertion of spontaneous, direct, unmediated spiritual insight into reality (typically with little or no prior training), which some term "enlightenment"." According to Versluis, immediatism is typical for Americans, who want "the fruit of religion, but not its obligations." Although immediatism has its roots in European culture and history as far back as Platonism, and also includes Perennialism, Versluis points to Ralph Waldo Emerson as its key ancestor, who "emphasized the possibility of immediate, direct spiritual knowledge and power."

Criticism
Neo-Advaita has been called a "controversial movement," and has been criticized, for its emphasis on insight alone, omitting the preparatory practices. It has also been criticised for its references to a "lineage" of Ramana Maharshi, whereas Ramana never claimed to have disciples and never appointed any successors.

Insight and practice

Insight alone is not enough

Some critics say that seeing through the 'illusion of ego' is the main point of neo-Advaita, and that this does not suffice. According to Caplan, the enlightenment-experiences induced by these teachers and their satsangs are considered to be superficial.

Practice is necessary

According to Dennis Waite, neo-Advaita claims to remove ignorance, but does not offer help to remove ignorance. According to Caplan, traditional Advaita Vedanta takes years of practice, which is quite different from the neo-Advaita claims. Classical Advaita Vedanta uses the "fourfold discipline" (sādhana-catustaya) to train students and attain moksha. Years of committed practice is needed to sever or destroy the "occlusion" the so-called "vasanas, samskaras, bodily sheaths and vrittis", and the "granthi or knot forming identification between Self and mind," and prepare the mind for the insight into non-duality. After awakening, "post awakening sadhana," or post-satori practice is necessary: "all of the great ones had a post awakening sadhana, including Ramana Maharishi, who spent many years sitting alone in Samadhi before he ever accepted his first student." After realization, further practice is necessary 'to ripen the fruit', as stated by Nisargadatya Maharaj: "the fruit falls suddenly, but the ripening takes time." Ed Muzika refers to Nisargadatta Maharaj, stating

Spiritual bypassing

Some teachers who have been associated with the Neo-Advaita movement, namely Jeff Foster and Andrew Cohen, have criticized what they argue is a tendency among leaders within the Neo-Advaita community to dismiss expressions of emotional pain or trauma as indicative of spiritual immaturity, a practice known as spiritual bypassing. Both have observed that their own insight or "awakening" did not put an end to being a human being with personal and egoic feelings, aspirations, and fears, which they no longer deem to be in conflict with healthy spiritual development. Although neither used the term "spiritual bypass", Cohen admitted that his "misguided efforts to create breakthroughs" caused "much harm" to some of his students.

Lineage

Western critics object to the perceived relation between Ramana Maharshi and Neo-Advaita, noting that Ramana never promoted any lineage, did not publicize himself as a guru, never claimed to have disciples, and never appointed any successors. Despite this, there are numerous contemporary teachers who assert, suggest, or are said by others, to be in his lineage. These assertions have been disputed by other teachers, stating that there is no lineage from Ramana Maharshi. Critics have also noted that Ramana and like-minded teachers like Nisargadatta Maharaj did not charge fees or donations.

Response
In response to some of these criticisms, Tony Parsons has written that classical Advaita Vedanta "is just another established religion with a proliferation of teachings and literature, all of which very successfully and consistently miss the mark," qualifying it as "one of the many systems of personal indoctrination promising the eventual spiritual fulfilment." According to Parsons, classical Advaita Vedanta "has no relevance to liberation because it is born out of a fundamental misconception," namely that there is something like a separate individual who can become enlightened. According to Parsons, this is "a direct denial of abiding oneness (Advaita)."

See also

Teachers
 Andrew Cohen
 Eckhart Tolle
 Rupert Spira
 Mooji
 Eli Jaxon-Bear
 Gangaji
General
 Nondualism
 Hinduism in the West
Buddhist equivalent topics
 Buddhist modernism
 Zen Narratives
 Dharma transmission
 Vipassana movement
Sociology
 New religious movement
 Sociological classifications of religious movements
Enlightenment
 Ahamkara
 Kenshō

Notes

References

Sources

Printed sources

Web-sources

Further reading

External links
Background
 Neo-Advaita demystified
 Neo-Advaita or Pseudo-Advaita and Real Advaita-Nonduality
 Traditional vs Neo-Advaita

Teachers
 advaita.org.uk: Traditional Advaita Vedanta & neo-Advaita Teachers
 Sarlo's Guru Rating Service: list of nondual teachers
 dmoz, Advaita Vedanta: Current Teachers

Ramana Maharshi
 J. Glenn Friesen (2006), Ramana Maharshi: Hindu and non-Hindu Interpretations of a Jivanmukta Critical assessment of the interpretations given to Ramana Maharshi

Personal accounts
 Andrew Cohen, An open letter to all my students upon return from my sabbatical
 Jeff Foster, The birth and death of fundamentalism in nonduality and Advaita teachings.
 Edward Muzika, Awakening versus Liberation

 
Advaita
New religious movements